Dumont is a city in Traverse County, Minnesota, United States. The population was 75 at the 2020 census.

History
A post office called Dumont has been in operation since 1886.

On June 22, 1919, at 6:30 pm there was a deadly tornado that killed one person, Nicholas Didlo, age 63. There was a total of $100,000 in property loss. The tornado came from the southeast side of the village leaving any warning for people to go into their cellars. Dumont was named by railroad officials.

Geography

U.S. Route 75 serves as a main route in the community.

Demographics

2010 census
As of the census of 2010, there were 100 people, 50 households, and 32 families living in the city. The racial makeup of the city was 99.0% White and 1.0% from two or more races. Hispanic or Latino of any race were 3.0% of the population.

There were 50 households, of which 24.0% had children under the age of 18 living with them, 54.0% were married couples living together, 8.0% had a female householder with no husband present, 2.0% had a male householder with no wife present, and 36.0% were non-families. 32.0% of all households were made up of individuals, and 14% had someone living alone who was 65 years of age or older. The average household size was 2.00 and the average family size was 2.41.

The median age in the city was 49 years. 16% of residents were under the age of 18; 4% were between the ages of 18 and 24; 24% were from 25 to 44; 31% were from 45 to 64; and 25% were 65 years of age or older. The gender makeup of the city was 51.0% male and 49.0% female.

2000 census
As of the census of 2000, there were 122 people, 51 households, and 32 families living in the city. The racial makeup of the city was 100.00% White.

There were 51 households, out of which 33.3% had children under the age of 18 living with them, 62.7% were married couples living together, and 35.3% were non-families. 33.3% of all households were made up of individuals, and 17.6% had someone living alone who was 65 years of age or older. The average household size was 2.39 and the average family size was 3.12.

In the city, the population was spread out, with 28.7% under the age of 18, 2.5% from 18 to 24, 28.7% from 25 to 44, 18.9% from 45 to 64, and 21.3% who were 65 years of age or older. The median age was 36 years. For every 100 females, there were 117.9 males. For every 100 females age 18 and over, there were 123.1 males.

The median income for a household in the city was $28,750, and the median income for a family was $36,250. Males had a median income of $56,875 versus $11,250 for females. The per capita income for the city was $23,118. There were 18.8% of families and 20.8% of the population living below the poverty line, including 45.5% of under eighteens and none of those over 64.

Notable Citizens
Famous sportscaster Dick Bremer grew up in Dumont, MN later moving to Staples, MN where he graduated from high school.

References

Cities in Minnesota
Cities in Traverse County, Minnesota